A first 277th Infantry Division was ordered to form on May 22, 1940, as part of the 10th mobilisation wave (10. Welle), but this order was rescinded after the French Surrender. A new 277th Infantry Division was formed in Croatia on November 17, 1943, as part of the 22nd mobilisation wave (22. Welle), the division was destroyed in the Battle of Normandy in August 1944. A third, 277th Volksgrenadier Division (277. Volksgrenadier-Division) was formed on September 4, 1944, in Hungary by redesignation of the newly formed 574th Volksgrenadier Division (574. Volksgrenadier-Division) of the 32nd mobilisation wave (32. Welle). In 1945 the division entered U.S. captivity in the Ruhr Pocket.

Operational history
Except for its formation time in Croatia and Hungary the 277th Infantry Division spent its entire operation history on the Western front. The division took part in the Battles of Normandy (where it was practically destroyed), and after reconstitution, the Lorraine campaign under Army Group G, beginning in November 1944.  It then participated in the Ardennes campaign.  It fought alongside the 12th VG Division in the effort to take Rocherath-Krinkelt and Elsenborn.

Organization

1943
 Grenadier-Regiment 989, I and II Battalions
 Grenadier-Regiment 990, I and II Battalions
 Grenadier-Regiment 991, I and II Battalions
 Artillerie-Regiment 277, I-IV Battalions
 Divisions-Füsilier-Abteilung 277
 Pionier-Battalion 277
 Infanterie-Divisions-Nachrichten-Abteilung 277
 Feldersatz-Battalion 277

1944
 Grenadier-Regiment 989, I and II Battalions
 Grenadier-Regiment 990, I and II Battalions
 Grenadier-Regiment 991, I and II Battalions
 Artillerie-Regiment 277, I-IV Battalions
 Divisions-Füsilier-Kompanie 277
 Panzer-Jäger-Abteilung 277
 Pionier-Battalion 277
 Infanterie-Divisions-Nachrichten-Abteilung 277

References
 Tessin, Georg. Verbände und Truppen der deutschen Wehrmacht und Waffen-SS 1939 - 1945 Volume 8

Infantry divisions of Germany during World War II
Military units and formations established in 1940
Military units and formations disestablished in 1945